"Moon Over Naples" is a 1965 instrumental composed and recorded by German bandleader Bert Kaempfert. The instrumental version reached No. 6 on Billboard's Adult Contemporary chart. It won a BMI Award in 1968.

Vocal versions of the song have been recorded as "Spanish Eyes" with lyrics by Eddie Snyder and Charles Singleton. The most notable of these was released by Al Martino, which topped Billboards Easy Listening chart for 4 weeks in 1966.  It is one of the most recorded songs with over 500 versions released in various languages.

Background
"Moon Over Naples" was composed by Bert Kaempfert. It was the first track on his album, The Magic Music of Far Away Places, for Decca Records. In 1968, "Moon Over Naples" earned Kaempfert one of five BMI Awards that year; the other awards were for his compositions "Lady", "Sweet Maria", "Strangers in the Night" and "The World We Knew (Over and Over)" with a posthumous BMI Award given September 16, 2003.

Two different set of lyrics were added to the tune by Charles Singleton and  Eddie Snyder. In one, "Moon Over Naples" was written as a Neapolitan song, and this vocal version was recorded by Sergio Franchi  in 1965, but the song did not chart.  In another set of lyrics, the composition became a song about a Mexican girl, and the song title was changed to "Spanish Eyes". Both lyricists are credited in these two versions.

Charts
Moon Over Naples

"Spanish Eyes"
The Austrian singer Freddy Quinn, a friend of Kaempfert who was involved in the production of Quinn's hit song "Die Gitarre und das Meer", first recorded "Spanish Eyes" in 1965 with English lyrics written by Eddie Snyder.  It was released in the United States by Polydor, and as it was rising in the regional charts, the single by Quinn was pulled from the market due to a dispute over the rights to the song between Polydor and Kaempfert's label Decca.

Al Martino version

"Spanish Eyes" was recorded by Al Martino and it became a hit single in 1966. The song was released in late 1965 in the United States, and it reached number 15 on the Billboard Hot 100 and spent four weeks atop the Billboard Easy Listening chart in early 1966. This vocal version was also a hit in Europe, where it sold an estimated 800,000 copies in Germany and made the UK Singles Chart twice, peaking at number 49 in 1970 and then reaching number five in August 1973.

All subsequent English versions use the title of "Spanish Eyes", with both Singleton and Snyder credited as lyricists.

Charts

Other versions
As "Spanish Eyes", the song would go on to be performed by diverse artists, among them: Bing Crosby, Elvis Presley,  Wayne Newton, Andy Williams (in his 1967 album, Born Free), and Faith No More.
A cover by Willie Nelson and Julio Iglesias peaked at number 8 on the Billboard Hot Country Singles chart in 1988.
Little Willie Littlefield recorded a version for his 1990 album Singalong with Little Willie Littlefield.
In 2013, vocal group Il Divo recorded a duet with British singer Engelbert Humperdinck. Produced by Alberto Quintero, it was included in the album Engelbert Calling released September 30, 2014.

Other language versions
Ivo Robić recorded a German version titled "Rot ist der Wein", which reached No. 14 on the West German chart in 1966. Robić also recorded a version in Serbo-Croat.
 The song has been recorded in French as "Tes yeux" (Luis Mariano), "Tous ces voyages" (Lucky Blondo), and "Vivre au soleil" (Nana Mouskouri). It was recorded as "Occhi spagnoli" in Italian, and "Spanska Ögon" in Swedish.

Popular culture
The song was sung by Homer Simpson in The Simpsons episode "Homer vs. Dignity". 
The song was sung, initially by Geoffrey Hutchings and Sheila Reid as the characters of Mel and Madge in the finale to the third season of the British TV sitcom Benidorm.

See also
List of number-one adult contemporary singles of 1966 (U.S.)

References

External links
Example of the original Kaempfert recording at Youtube.com

Songs about Naples
1965 singles
1988 singles
Songs with music by Bert Kaempfert
Songs written by Eddie Snyder
Songs written by Charles Singleton (songwriter)
Al Martino songs
Willie Nelson songs
Julio Iglesias songs
Charlie Rich songs
Little Willie Littlefield songs
Andy Williams songs
Columbia Records singles
1960s instrumentals
Schlager songs
1965 songs